William Henry Wilton (17 March 1889 – 22 February 1966) was an Australian rules footballer who played with Geelong in the Victorian Football League (VFL).

Notes

External links 

1889 births
1966 deaths
Australian rules footballers from Victoria (Australia)
Geelong Football Club players
People educated at Geelong College